The 1995–96 season was Cardiff City F.C.'s 69th season in the Football League. They competed in the 24-team Division Three, then the fourth tier of English football, finishing twenty-second.

Players
First team squad.

League standings

Results by round

Fixtures and results

Third Division

Source

League Cup

FA Cup

Auto Windscreens Shield

See also
List of Cardiff City F.C. seasons

References

Bibliography

Welsh Football Data Archive

1995-96
Welsh football clubs 1995–96 season
Card